A. neglecta may refer to:

 Aegilops neglecta, the three-awned goatgrass, a plant species
 Agave neglecta, the wild century plant, now a synonym of Agave weberi
 Amphisbaena neglecta, a worm lizard species found in Brazil

See also
 Neglecta (disambiguation)